NHS North West was a strategic health authority (SHA) of the National Health Service in England.  It operated in the North West region, which is coterminous with the local government office region.

When created in 2006 it had regional oversight of 24 Primary Care Trusts, 23 acute NHS trusts, 8 mental health trusts, 7 specialist trusts, as well as the North West Ambulance Service.

In October 2011, in preparation for planned government changes, NHS North West, alongside NHS Yorkshire and Humberside and NHS North East became a part of the NHS North of England SHA cluster - a temporary administrative merger to manage the North of England health economy until the planned dissolution of SHAs in March 2013. The merger initially retained all staff but merged the three separate boards into one. The former Chief Executive of NHS North West, Mike Farrar left at that time to become the Chief Executive of the NHS Confederation.

The authority closed on 31 March 2013 as part of the Health and Social Care Act 2012.

Acute trusts

Greater Manchester 
 Central Manchester University Hospitals NHS Foundation Trust
 The Christie NHS Foundation Trust
 Pennine Acute Hospital NHS Trust
 Royal Bolton Hospital NHS Foundation Trust
 Stockport NHS Foundation Trust
 Salford Royal NHS Foundation Trust
 Tameside Hospital NHS Foundation Trust
 Trafford Healthcare NHS Trust
 University Hospital of South Manchester NHS Foundation Trust
 Wrightington, Wigan & Leigh NHS Foundation Trust

Merseyside 
 Alder Hey Children's NHS Foundation Trust
 Liverpool Women's NHS Foundation Trust
 Royal Liverpool and Broadgreen University Hospitals NHS Trust
 Aintree Foundation University Hospital NHS Trust

Lancashire 
 Blackpool, Fylde and Wyre Hospitals NHS Foundation Trust
 East Lancashire Hospitals NHS Trust
 Lancashire Teaching Hospitals NHS Foundation Trust
 North Cumbria Hospitals NHS Foundation Trust
 University Hospitals of Morecambe Bay NHS Foundation Trust

Primary care trusts 

 Ashton, Leigh and Wigan
 Blackburn with Darwen Teaching
 Blackpool
 Bolton
 Bury
 Central and Eastern Cheshire
 Central Lancashire
 Cumbria
 East Lancashire
 St Helens
 Heywood, Middleton and Rochdale
 Knowsley
 Liverpool
 Manchester
 North Lancashire Teaching
 Oldham
 Salford
 Sefton
 Stockport
 Tameside and Glossop
 Trafford
 Warrington and Halton
 Western Cheshire
 Wirral

In October 2011, in preparation for planned government changes, the 24 Primary Care Trusts were organised under five sub-regional clusters: Greater Manchester, Merseyside, Lancashire, Cheshire & Wirral, and Cumbria. The initial effect of this clustering was again to telescope the number of separate boards whilst retaining most staff initially in their current roles as new Clinical Commissioning Groups (CCGs) were set up and began to assume commissioning responsibilities.

External links 
 Official website
 Health Equality Library Portal
 Equality Performance Improvement Toolkit

North West
2013 disestablishments in England